Nilsjohan was a Swedish manufacturer of kitchen accessories. The company was founded in 1888 as Nilsson och Johansson, but changed its name to AB Nilsjohan in the 1950s. Their products were associated with the 20th-century Folkhemmet movement. The brand was later acquired by Iittala.

References

Swedish brands
Manufacturing companies established in 1888
Swedish companies established in 1888